Marina Gera (born 29 June 1984) is a Hungarian actress. She was the first actress in her country to win an Emmy Award for her role in the film drama Eternal Winter at the 47th International Emmy Awards.

Filmography 
2019: Good Morning (Short) (post-production) ... Sára
2018: A Hawk & A Hacksaw: The Magic Spring (Short) ... woman II  
2018: The Field Guide to Evil ... Nymph (segment "Cobblers' Lot")
2018: Örök tél ...Irén (won International Emmy Award for Best Actress)
2017: Intermezzo (Short)
2017: L.U.F.I. (curta-metragem) ... Girl in the cemetery
2017: The Basement ... Doll-Face
2016: Aranyélet ...Gemenci Mari / Mari Gemenci
2016: In the Same Garden
2014: Senki szigete ...Marina
2014: Fehér isten ... Woman at Dog Fight
2014: Szabadesés ... Woman 
2014: Munkaügyek ... Viola
2013: Prágai hétvége (Short) ... Singer
2011: Úsvit (Short)
2009: Utolsó idök (uncredited)
2007: Szerafina'' (Short) ... Szerafina Fátyol

References

External links
 Marina Gera on IMDb

1984 births
Hungarian film actresses
Hungarian television actresses
International Emmy Award for Best Actress winners
Living people
People from Szeged
21st-century Hungarian actresses